Cheyenne Township may refer to:

 Cheyenne Township, Barton County, Kansas
 Cheyenne Township, Lane County, Kansas, Lane County, Kansas
 Cheyenne Township, Roger Mills County, Oklahoma, see List of Oklahoma townships
 Rainy Creek/Cheyenne Township, Pennington County, South Dakota, see List of townships in South Dakota

Township name disambiguation pages